Beastmaster may refer to:

 The Beast Master, a 1959 novel by Andre Norton
 The Beastmaster (film), a 1982 film loosely based on the novel
 Beastmaster 2: Through the Portal of Time
 Beastmaster III: The Eye of Braxus
 Beastmaster (TV series), a 1999 television series based on the 1982 film
 "Beastmaster", one of several Final Fantasy character classes
 Beast Master (manga), a manga created by the artist Kyousuke Motomi
 "Beastmaster", an X-Wild song from the album So What
 Ultimate Beastmaster, a Netflix reality TV show